The 1979 Colorado Buffaloes football team represented the University of Colorado in the Big Eight Conference during the 1979 NCAA Division I-A football season. Led by first-year head coach Chuck Fairbanks, the Buffaloes finished at 3–8 (2–5 in Big 8, tied for fifth), and played home games on campus at Folsom Field in Boulder, Colorado. 

A one-point win at Indiana in the fourth game was Colorado's sole victory in their first nine; they won the final two games of the season and avoided the conference cellar.

Previously the head coach of the New England Patriots for six years, Fairbanks was hired by athletic director Eddie Crowder in mid-December 1978. Difficulties with the NFL club's ownership resulted in a legal battle until early April, when a group of CU boosters (Flatirons Club) bought out Fairbanks' contract, allowing him to leave the Patriots just days ahead of the start of the Buffs' spring practice.

Schedule

 Note: The opener against Oregon was the first college football game ever televised by ESPN.

Personnel

Roster

Starters
Offense: QB Bill Solomon, HB Lance Olander/Charles Davis, FB Willie Beebe, SE Donnie Holmes, WB Kazell Pugh, TE Bob Niziolek/Greg Willett/Doug Krahenbuhl, LT Stan Brock, LG Paul Butero, C Roger Gunter/Bob Sebro, RG Art Dale Johnson/Guy Thurston, RT Karry Kelley
Defense: LE George Visger, NT Laval Short, RE Kevin Sazama, OLB Steve Doolittle, ILB Bill Roe, ILB Charles Scott, OLB Brian McCabe/Bob Humble, LCB Mark Haynes, SS Mike E. Davis, FS Tim Roberts, RCB Jesse Johnson/Tim Stampley
Specialists: K Tom Field, P Lance Olander

References

External links
University of Colorado Athletics – 1979 football roster
Sports-Reference – 1979 Colorado Buffaloes

Colorado
Colorado Buffaloes football seasons
Colorado Buffaloes football